Samuel Stanley Peck (November 20, 1829 – November 10, 1901) was an Ontario lawyer, judge and political figure. He represented Victoria North in the Legislative Assembly of Ontario from 1879 to 1883 as a Liberal member.

He was born in Ameliasburgh Township in Prince Edward County, Upper Canada in 1829, a descendant of United Empire Loyalists. In 1852, he opened the first telegraph office in Napanee for the Great Western Telegraph Company. He moved to Minden the following year and began the study of law. Peck married Sarah Ann Harder in 1857. He served as reeve for Snowdon Township and as warden for Peterborough County. Peck was stipendary magistrate and judge in the division courts for Haliburton County and also served as county registrar and the first treasurer and clerk for the county. In 1876, he married Susan Vandervoort after the death of his first wife. He became reeve for Dysart Township in 1882.

He moved to North Dakota in 1883 and died in Petaluma, California in 1901.

The geographical township of Peck in Nipissing District was named in his honour.

External links 
The Canadian parliamentary companion and annual register, 1880, CH Mackintosh

Lennox and Addington Historical Society : papers and records. Volume II (1910)
Fragments of a Dream : pioneering in Dysart Township and Haliburton Village, L Dobrzensky (1985)

1829 births
1901 deaths
Ontario Liberal Party MPPs
People from Prince Edward County, Ontario